The 35th Filmfare Awards South ceremony honoring the winners of the best of South Indian cinema in 1987 was an event held in 1988.

Jury

Awards

Kannada cinema

Malayalam cinema

Tamil cinema

Telugu cinema

References

External links
 
 

Filmfare Awards South